Greatest Hits is a compilation album released by Will Smith. The album was released on November 26, 2002, and was his last release on Columbia Records. Greatest Hits is also the first compilation to bring together music from Smith's early work with DJ Jazzy Jeff and his solo career.

Track listing 

Arabian Nights Will Smith 
Prince Ali Will Smith 
Friend Like Me Will Smith

Certifications

References

2002 greatest hits albums
Will Smith albums
Columbia Records compilation albums